Drain Gang (formerly known as Gravity Boys Shield Gang) is an artistic collective, focusing on music and fashion.

History 
The group formed in 2013 in Stockholm. Thaiboy Digital was residing in Sweden at the time. Bladee and Ecco2K had previously collaborated as the grindcore duo Krossad. Signing to the YEAR0001 label, the members of Drain Gang gained prominence in the cloud rap scene from their collaborations with labelmate Yung Lean.

Speaking on the meaning of the group's name, Bladee states:

In 2015, Thaiboy Digital's visa expired and he was deported from Sweden. Through the internet, he has managed to continue collaborating with the other members from his new home in Bangkok. He and Bladee released a collaborative EP titled AvP in 2016, which featured production from both Whitearmor and Yung Sherman.

In 2017, Bladee, Ecco2K and Thaiboy Digital released their collaborative album D&G, featuring production from member Whitearmor, and frequent collaborators Gud, Yung Sherman, Woesum, and Australian-based collective Ripsquadd.

In 2019, the group released a collaborative EP titled Trash Island. Whitearmor served as the executive producer, while Ripsquadd and German producer Mechatok returned to contribute additional production. The EP was a surprise release, as no announcement was made on YEAR0001's nor the group's various social medias.

In late 2021, the group announced a 2022 Drain Gang world tour, consisting of 23 performances across Europe and North America.

In 2022, Bladee and Ecco2K released a collaborative single titled "Amygdala" produced by Mechatok. A collaborative album by Bladee & Ecco2K, entitled Crest, was released unannounced in March of the same year. The album, containing the single "Girls just want to have fun", was produced entirely by Whitearmor.

Collaborative discography
GTBSG (2013) (Bladee, Ecco2K and Thaiboy Digital, with production from DJ Smokey, Josh Diamond, Saavagebeatz, Whitearmor and Yung Sherman)
AvP (2016) (Bladee and Thaiboy Digital, with production from Whitearmor and Yung Sherman)
D&G (2017) (Bladee, Ecco2K and Thaiboy Digital, with production from Gud, Woesum, Whitearmor, Ripsquadd, and Yung Sherman)
Trash Island (2019) (Bladee, Ecco2K, and Thaiboy Digital with production from Whitearmor and Ripsquadd, as well as producer Colby Sexton)
Crest (2022) (Bladee and Ecco2k with production from Whitearmor)
Ceremony (2023) (Bladee and Yung Lean in collaboration with Skrillex)

References

Swedish musical groups
Musical groups established in 2013
2013 establishments in Sweden